John Herbert Leslie (1868-1934) was Dean of Lismore from 1930 until 1934.

He was educated at Trinity College, Dublin and ordained in 1894. He began his ecclesiastical career with a curacy at Christ Church Cathedral, Waterford. After that he was Rector of Shanrahan then Clonmel.

References

Alumni of Trinity College Dublin
Deans of Lismore
1868 births
1934 deaths